Prince Karol Stanisław Radziwiłł (Exonym: Charles Stanislaus: 27 February 1734 – 21 November 1790) was a Polish nobleman, diplomat and prince of the Commonwealth. He is frequently referred to by his well-known sobriquet Panie Kochanku ("My Beloved Sir") to distinguish him from his earlier namesake. Prince Radziwiłł held several important posts; from 1752 he was the Master Swordbearer of the Lithuania, and in 1757 he became one of the first recipients of the Order of the White Eagle. From 1762 he was Voivode of Vilnius.

Radziwiłł was born on 27 February 1734 to General-Hetman Michał Kazimierz "Rybeńko" Radziwiłł and Princess Urszula Franciszka Wiśniowiecka and spent his childhood in Nieśwież, in the Grand Duchy of Lithuania, which was then part of the Polish–Lithuanian Commonwealth.

In 1767 he became Marshal General of the Radom Confederation and, the following year, Marshal of the Bar Confederation. After its fall in 1772 he emigrated, but in 1777 returned to the Polish–Lithuanian Commonwealth and resumed all his previous posts after having first pledged his loyalty to Polish King Stanisław II Augustus, whom he had previously opposed. During the Great Sejm from 1788 until his death in 1790 he was a leading opponent of reform, King Stanisław Augustus and his allies; the members of the so-called Familia political party headed by the Czartoryski family.

Radziwiłł was the wealthiest magnate in Poland-Lithuania, in the second half of the 18th century. However, he was popular among the poorer nobility. Suffering from obesity and the after-effects of alcoholism, in the spring of 1790 Karol Stanisław Radziwiłł moved to the town of Biała Podlaska in the Crown of the Kingdom of Poland, where he died on November 21 leaving no issue to inherit his enormous wealth.

Julian Ursyn Niemcewicz stated that Radziwiłł was a "citizen with a heart of stone whose sacrifices for the Polish nation were remarkable and unforgettable". Radziwiłł was also immortalized in Rejtan, the Fall of Poland, an oil painting by the Polish artist Jan Matejko, finished in 1866, depicting the protest of Tadeusz Rejtan against the First Partition of Poland during the Partition Sejm of 1773. Both a depiction of a historical moment, and an allegory for the surrounding period of Polish history, the painting is one of Matejko's most famous works, and an iconic picture of an emotional protest.

Pantler Horeszko, from the epic poem Pan Tadeusz by Adam Mickiewicz, was loosely based on Karol Stanisław Radziwiłł.

The prince owned a house on the Rue Neuve des Bons Enfants in Paris. The street is now called Rue Radziwill.

See also

List of szlachta
Radziwiłł family
Polish-Lithuanian Commonwealth

Notes

References

Citations

Bibliography

 "Radziwiłł, Karol Stanisław 'Panie Kochanku'" ("Karol Stanisław 'My Dear Sir' Radziwiłł"), Encyklopedia Polski (Encyclopedia of Poland), Kraków, Wydawnictwo Ryszard Kluszczyński, 1996, p. 564.
 D. Sidorski, „Panie Kochanku”, Katowice 1987, s. 34.
 Mariusz Machynia, Valdas Rakutis, Czesław Srzednicki, Oficerowie wojska Wielkiego Księstwa Litewskiego. Spisy, Kraków 1999, s. 81, 470.
 Urzędnicy centralni i dygnitarze Wielkiego Księstwa Litewskiego XIV-XVIII wieku spisy opracowali Henryk Lulewicz i Andrzej Rachuba, Kórnik 1994, s. 146.
 Diarjusze sejmowe z wieku XVIII.T.III. Diarjusze sejmów z lat 1750, 1752, 1754 i 1758, Warszawa 1937, s. 131.
 Diarjusze sejmowe z wieku XVIII.T.III. Diarjusze sejmów z lat 1750, 1752, 1754 i 1758, Warszawa 1937, s. 244.
 Materiały do dziejów bezkrólewia po śmierci Augusta III i pierwszych lat dziesięciu panowania Stanisława Augusta Poniatowskiego, t. I Lwów 1857, s. 45-49.
 Teresa Zielińska, Radziwiłłowie herbu Trąby-dzieje rodu, w: Radziwiłłowie herbu Trąby, Warszawa 1996, s. 22. Uwaga! Teresa Zielińska mylnie nazywa Radziwiłła marszałkiem generalnym konfederacji radomskiej na Litwie, Panie Kochanku był marszałkiem konfederacji generalnej (koronnej), marszałkiem litewskim był Stanisław Brzostowski.
 Wykaz polskich lóż wolnomularskich oraz ich członków w latach 1738-1821 poprzedzony zarysem historji wolnomularstwa polskiego i ustroju Wielkiego Wschodu Narodowego Polskiego: uzupełnienia i aneksy, opracował Ludwik Hass, b. r. w., s. 113.
 Janusz Iwaszkiewicz, Wykaz dóbr ziemskich skonfiskowanych przez rządy zaborcze w latach 1773-1867, Warszawa 1929, s. 5, 15.
 Volumina Legum, t. IX, Kraków 1889, s. 470.
 Мальдзіс А. І. Беларусь у люстэрку мемуарнай літаратуры XVIII ст. — Мн.: Мастацкая літаратура, 1982. — С. 115
 Kawalerowie i statuty Orderu Orła Białego 1705-2008, 2008, s. 189.
 Бантыш-Каменский Н.Н. Списки кавалерам российских императорских орденов Св. Андрея Первозванного, Св. Екатерины, Св. Александра Невского и Св. Анны с учреждения до установления в 1797 году орденского капитула, 2005, s. 149.

1734 births
1790 deaths
People from Nesvizh
People from Nowogródek Voivodeship (1507–1795)
Karol II Stanislaw
Secular senators of the Polish–Lithuanian Commonwealth
Generals of the Polish–Lithuanian Commonwealth
Bar confederates
Radom confederates
Voivode of Vilnius
Recipients of the Order of the White Eagle (Poland)